Nicholas Fortes (born November 11, 1996) is an American professional baseball catcher for the Miami Marlins of Major League Baseball (MLB). He made his MLB debut in 2021.

Amateur career
Fortes attended DeLand High School in DeLand, Florida.

Undrafted out of high school, he attended the University of Mississippi and played college baseball for the Rebels. In his junior season at Ole Miss, he hit .319/.435/.519 with 11 home runs and 49 RBIs. He was drafted by the Miami Marlins in the 4th round of the 2018 MLB draft.

Professional career
He began his professional career in 2018 by splitting the season between the GCL Marlins, the Batavia Muckdogs, and the Greensboro Grasshoppers, hitting a combined .226/.346/.258 with no home runs and 11 RBIs. He spent the 2019 season with the Jupiter Hammerheads, hitting .217/.293/.308 with 3 home runs and 29 RBIs.

He did not play in 2020 due to the cancellation of the Minor League Baseball season because of the COVID-19 pandemic. He split the 2021 minor league season between the Pensacola Blue Wahoos and the Jacksonville Jumbo Shrimp, hitting a combined .245/.332/.367 with 7 home runs and 44 RBIs.

On September 17, 2021, Fortes' contract was selected to the active roster. He made his MLB debut the next day and finished the season with 4 home runs and 7 RBIs in 14 games.

Personal life
Fortes and his wife Jessica were married in November 2020.

References

External links

Ole Miss Rebels bio

1996 births
Living people
People from DeLand, Florida
Sportspeople from Volusia County, Florida
Baseball players from Florida
Major League Baseball catchers
Miami Marlins players
Ole Miss Rebels baseball players
Gulf Coast Marlins players
Batavia Muckdogs players
Greensboro Grasshoppers players
Jupiter Hammerheads players
Pensacola Blue Wahoos players
Jacksonville Jumbo Shrimp players